The London to Lewes Way is a  long Roman road between Watling Street at Peckham and Lewes in Sussex. The road passes through Beckenham and West Wickham, then crosses the North Downs above Titsey, on the county boundary between Surrey and Kent, and is overlain by Edenbridge High Street.
The road continues on this alignment onto the high ground of Ashdown Forest, where the more grassy vegetation on the silted up outer ditches contrasts very clearly with surrounding heather in aerial photographs, then descends through Piltdown to Lewes, linking with the Sussex Greensand Way at Barcombe Mills and with a network of roads at Lewes.

Dating evidence
First and early second century pottery fragments were found over the edge of the road near Barcombe Mills, which, together with the heavy construction and planned alignments, indicate a late 1st or early 2nd century date.

Design and construction
Five main alignments were used for the road, with local diversions from them to ease gradients and avoid wet ground. Flint and gravel were used over the North Downs and towards the South Downs, with slag from the Wealden iron industry used extensively for the middle sections, sometimes mixed with sandstone from Ashdown Forest and sometimes as a solid mass. At Holtye near East Grinstead a length of road excavated in 1939 revealed iron slag metalling showing cart ruts. Part of this has been left exposed and fenced off by the Sussex Archaeological Trust for viewing.

As no kerb was used the intended width is not known and spreading of material may have increased the eventual width.

Thickness of metalling also varies greatly, as does the size of agger.

Route

Peckham to Blythe Hill Fields
This northernmost alignment branched from Watling Street close to the Old Kent Road in what is now the back garden of Number 77, Asylum Road, in Peckham, running parallel to the road for some distance under other back gardens. Here the road was built of gravel on a base of pebbles. Passing just east of Nunhead railway station the road runs along Ivydale Road, crosses the Crystal Palace Railway, and crosses Brockley Rise at St. Hilda's Church heading to Blythe Hill Fields.

Blythe Hill Fields to Titsey

On Blythe Hill the road turns 9 degrees to the south, and crosses the River Pool, then turns another 6 degrees southward onto the next main alignment. Here the intact road was found to be made of gravel on pebbles and flints under a golf course. Going through Beckenham it passes close to Langley House then east of West Wickham village centre, crosses Corkscrew Hill, and goes down to the Addington to Hayes road, where there was once a small settlement. From Rowdown Woods the Surrey/Kent county boundary follows the road, making a V shaped kink at Skid Hill where the road deviates from the alignment to cross a steep valley.

Titsey to Marlpit Hill
 south of the Pilgrims Way, at the foot of the escarpment, the road passed a Roman temple where it turned onto the major alignment that goes to Marlpit Hill north of Edenbridge. This alignment was parallel to that north of the downs, but half a mile further east. The M25 motorway cuts across the road south of the temple site, at the end of the eastern slip roads of Clacket Lane services. Some Roman artifacts found during construction of the service areas are on display there. In the woods east of Limpsfield Chart the road deviates from the alignment to avoid steep slopes, curving to the east on a route followed by the modern road through Crockham Hill before rejoining the alignment north of Marlpit Hill.

Marlpit Hill to Ashdown Forest
At Marlpit Hill the road makes a small direction change of only three degrees, and almost entirely keeps to this line to the high ground of Ashdown Forest. The straight run of Edenbridge High Street, crossing the River Eden and continuing to Dencross, where it continues as a private drive, is the most impressive surviving section of the road. Beyond this the road has been lost, seen only in hedgelines and traces of iron slag metalling in fields. In Peters Wood at Holtye an agger with iron slag metalling can be seen and on a footpath south of the A264 road a length of almost 100 metres of intact road was excavated in 1939, revealing a slag metalled surface in excellent condition and showing wheel marks. Part of this area south of the road has been kept uncovered by the Sussex Archaeological Trust. The agger is clearly visible south of this point and again at Butcherfield Lane, Hartfield, where  of slag metalling was found on a large wide agger. The road then climbs a small steep hill in an engineered cutting. At Chuck Hatch the road enters Ashdown Forest, zig-zagging to cross a gill at Loneoak Hall, then maintaining its straight line onto the high forest. It then turns 46 degrees west and uses a number of straight alignments to follow the ridge to Camp Hill. This forest section was metalled with sandstone, and was more clearly visible before being damaged by tank training exercises during World War II.

Camp Hill to Lewes

The southernmost  alignment to Lewes was sighted between Camp Hill and Malling Hill on the east side of Lewes. A slag metalled agger exists at Old Workhouse Farm where the road leaves the open forest. After passing west of Maresfield the road can be traced through Park Wood and Fairhazel Wood at Piltdown as an agger with slag metalling. The road passes to the west of Isfield's remote church, through a triangular water meadow, before crossing the River Ouse beside a Norman castle motte, suggesting that there was still a river crossing to guard at the Norman conquest. Near Gallops Farm the road runs along the eastern side of Alder Coppice and traces of slag can be found in the fields all the way to Barcombe Mills and the junction with the Sussex Greensand Way. Some pottery fragments found at the road edge suggest a date of 100 A.D. or earlier. The modern A26 road runs on the line from Pay Gate Cottages, past Upper Stoneham Farm, then turns southwest to skirt round Malling Down while the Roman road continues along the east side of the allotments and over the shoulder of the down to Cliffe.

See also
 Roman Britain
 Roman roads in Britain

References

Bibliography

Roman roads in England
Archaeological sites in London
Archaeological sites in East Sussex
Roads in London
Roads in East Sussex
Roads in Surrey
Roads in Kent
Ashdown Forest